The 10th Goya Awards were presented in Madrid, Spain on 27 January 1996.

Nobody Will Speak of Us When We're Dead won the award for Best Film.

Winners and nominees

Major award nominees

Other award nominees

Honorary Goya

References

External links
Official website (Spanish)

10
1995 film awards
1995 in Spanish cinema